The Khumbu Glacier is located in the Khumbu region of northeastern Nepal between Mount Everest and the Lhotse-Nuptse ridge. The Khumbu Glacier is followed for the final part of the trail to one of the Everest Base Camps. The start of the glacier is in the Western Cwm near Everest. The glacier has a large icefall, the Khumbu Icefall, at the west end of the lower Western Cwm. This icefall is the first major obstacle—and among the more dangerous—on the standard south col route to the Everest summit. It is also the largest glacier of Nepal. 
 

Overview

See also
 
 List of glaciers
 Retreat of glaciers since 1850

References

External links
Pictures of Khumbu glacier

Mount Everest
Glaciers of the Himalayas
Glaciers of Nepal